The Pops Goes Country is the title of the first collaborative recording by guitarist Chet Atkins and Arthur Fiedler with the Boston Pops Orchestra. The arrangements were done by Richard Hayman.

Track listing

Side one
 "Country Gentleman" (Atkins, Boudleaux Bryant)
 "Tennessee Waltz" (Pee Wee King)
 "Alabama Jubilee" (Jack Yellen, George L. Cobb)
 "Faded Love" (Bob Wills, Johnnie Lee Wills)
 "In the Pines/Wildwood Flower/On Top of Old Smokey" (Traditional)
 "Windy and Warm" (John D. Loudermilk)

Side two
 "I'll Fly Away" (Albert E. Brumley)
 "Adios Amigo" (Jay Livingston, Ralph Freed)
 "John Henry/Listen to the Mocking Bird" (Traditional)
 "Cold, Cold Heart" (Hank Williams)
 "I'm Thinking Tonight of My Blue Eyes" (A. P. Carter)
 "Orange Blossom Special" (Ervin T. Rouse)

Personnel
Chet Atkins – guitar
Henry Strzelecki - bass
John Greubel - drums
The Boston Pops Orchestra - orchestra
Richard Hayman - arranger
Arthur Fiedler - conductor

References

External links
 Windy and Warm Video

1966 albums
Chet Atkins albums
RCA Records albums
Arthur Fiedler albums